Boston City Council elections were held on November 5, 2013. Twelve seats (eight district representatives and four at-large members) were contested in the general election, as the incumbent in district 3 was unopposed. Eight seats (the four at-large members, and districts 1, 4, 5, and 8) had also been contested in the preliminary election held on September 24, 2013.

At-large
Councillors Ayanna Pressley and Stephen J. Murphy were re-elected, while the seats formerly held by John R. Connolly and Felix G. Arroyo were won by Michael F. Flaherty and Michelle Wu. Connolly and Arroyo did not seek re-election, as they ran for Mayor of Boston; Arroyo was eliminated in the preliminary election, while Connolly was defeated by Marty Walsh in the general election.

 write-in votes

District 1
Councillor Salvatore LaMattina was re-elected.

District 2
Councillor Bill Linehan was re-elected.

District 3
Councillor Frank Baker ran unopposed and was re-elected.

District 4
Councillor Charles Yancey was re-elected.

District 5
The seat formerly held by Robert Consalvo was won by Timothy McCarthy. Consalvo did not seek re-election, as he was running for Mayor of Boston.

District 6
Councillor Matt O'Malley was re-elected.

District 7
Councillor Tito Jackson was re-elected.

 write-in votes

District 8
The seat formerly held by Michael P. Ross was won by Josh Zakim. Ross did not seek re-election, as he was running for Mayor of Boston.

 write-in votes

District 9
Councillor Mark Ciommo was re-elected.

See also
 List of members of Boston City Council
 2013 Boston mayoral election

References

Further reading

External links
 2013 Election Results at boston.gov

City Council election
Boston City Council elections
Boston City Council election
Boston City Council